Marc Eidlitz (21 January 1826 – 15 April 1892) was a builder active in New York City, where he was prominent in the construction industry, in partnership with his son Otto Eidlitz (1860–1928).

Biography

Marc was born Markus to a Jewish family in Prague, Bohemia. He emigrated to the United States in 1846 with his mother Judith Eidlitz after the death of his father Abraham. Having served a four-year apprenticeship, he set up in business for himself in 1852 - the year of his marriage - and founded the construction firm, Marc Eidlitz & Son in New York City.

The firm built the St. Regis Hotel and many other projects.  Through his influence, the Masons Builders' Association of New York played a major role in founding the National Association of Builders. In New York, he was President of the Building Trades' Club and of the Germanic Savings Bank.

Eidlitz made his home at 123 East 72nd Street, where he died. He had four sons and a daughter. His son Otto Eidlitz took over the business after he died. His brother Leopold Eidlitz was a well-known architect, as was Leopold's son, Cyrus L. W. Eidlitz. Marc converted to Catholicism and kept close ties to the German immigrant community, becoming president of Germania Bank in 1888.

Selected commercial commissions

The following structures erected by Eidlitz were all in New York City, unless otherwise identified.
A mission on 20th Street, commissioned by William Colgate
Broadway Tabernacle (1857–58)
Lord and Taylor Building, Broadway and Grand Street
The German Hospital (now Lenox Hill Hospital at another site)
Saint Vincent's Hospital
Home of the Sisters of Bon Secours
Church of the Incarnation, Madison Avenue and 35th Street
Temple Emanu-El, former building at Fifth Avenue and 43rd Street
St. George's clergy house, 16th Street
Astor Library
Steinway Hall
Gallatin Bank
Metropolitan Opera House (J. Cleaveland Cady, architect, 1883)
Seamen's Savings Bank
Eagle Fire Insurance Company
Schermerhorn Building, 376 Lafayette Street (Henry J. Hardenbergh, architect, 1889)
Astor Building
Eden Musée
Western Electric Building
Lancashire Fire Insurance Company
Empire Building, Broadway and Rector Street
Germania Bank Building, 190 Bowery (Robert Maynicke, architect, 1898)

Private dwellings
J. Pierpont Morgan House
Ogden Goelet House
Rober L. Stuart House

Further reading
Kathryn Holliday, Leopold Eidlitz: Architecture and Idealism in the Gilded Age (New York: W.W. Norton, 2008)

References 

19th-century American people
19th-century Czech people
Austro-Hungarian Jews
Austro-Hungarian emigrants to the United States
People from the Kingdom of Bohemia
Businesspeople from Prague
1826 births
1892 deaths
American real estate businesspeople
Converts to Roman Catholicism from Judaism
American Roman Catholics
19th-century American businesspeople